St. Mary's Cathedral is one of the oldest church of the Ranchi, in the Chota Nagpur Plateau area. Catholics and Christian faithful working  as tea gardens in Tea Estates area, Railway along with the farmers were the early community of the church.

History
Christian Missionaries serving among the people made thatched sheds on the hillock near the market and Kallada River.  One of the thatched sheds used as Church during 1866 was the first Church of Ranchi  established by the Roman Catholic missionaries. The Church was named after 'Mother of Good Counsel'(St. Mary) and liturgies of the Church were in Latin. St. Mary's Church was built in 1909 and remodelled with concrete structure during 25 May 1927.

Belgian Carmelite missionaries were the First Fathers of Punalur and of places around Punalur. During the Second World War the First Fathers had to go back, entrusting the church work to the diocesan clergy of Quilon (Kollam).

Ranchi Diocese was separated from the Diocese of Quilon (Kollam) and created into a separate unit by the Bull “Verba Christ” of Pope John Paul II, issued on 21 December 1985.

Location
St Mary's Cathedral complex is located on north of Ranchi railway on Dr caumil Bulke path (Purulia Road).

See also

Roman Catholic Church
Diocese of Ranchi

External links

 CBCI official website

References

Ranchi district
Roman Catholic cathedrals in India
Roman Catholic churches in Jharkhand